The 2005 British Grand Prix (officially the 2005 Formula 1 Foster's British Grand Prix) was a Formula One race held in Silverstone Circuit on 10 July 2005 at 13:00 BST (UTC+1). It was the eleventh race of the 2005 Formula One season and the last race for then Minardi driver Patrick Friesacher.

Friday drivers 
The bottom 6 teams in the 2004 Constructors' Championship were entitled to run a third car in free practice on Friday. These drivers drove on Friday but did not compete in qualifying or the race.

Report

Qualifying 
For the second consecutive race, Renault's Fernando Alonso took pole position while his championship rival, McLaren's Kimi Räikkönen, was demoted ten places on the grid following an engine failure. Räikkönen, who had originally qualified second with a time just 0.027 seconds slower than Alonso's, suffered this engine failure during Saturday free practice. This promoted BAR's Jenson Button, in his home race, to the front row, with the top ten being completed by Juan Pablo Montoya in the second McLaren, Jarno Trulli in the Toyota, Rubens Barrichello in the Ferrari, Giancarlo Fisichella in the second Renault, Takuma Sato in the second BAR, Ralf Schumacher in the second Toyota, Michael Schumacher in the second Ferrari, and Jacques Villeneuve in the Sauber. Jordan's Tiago Monteiro started at the rear of the grid after failing to set a time, following an engine failure during Friday practice.

Race 
Before the race, a minute of silence was held as a mark of respect for those who had lost their lives in the London bombings three days earlier. Daily Express reporter Bob McKenzie honored the pledge to run naked around the Silverstone track if McLaren won the race in 2004. McLaren boss Ron Dennis sent McKenzie on his way two hours before the start of the race. He arrived at the finish line 36 minutes later after honouring his promise wearing nothing more than silver body paint and a sporran. McKenzie's run raised money for charity.

The weather was hot, with air temperature at 30 °C, and the track temperature at 45 °C as the cars completed the formation lap. Sato stalled as he came to the grid, but race director Charlie Whiting nonetheless started the race, with the safety car being deployed on lap 2 to allow the marshals to safely return the BAR to the pit lane. Sato would eventually rejoin the race, two laps behind the leaders. Montoya made a fast start, passing Button off the grid and then overtaking Alonso for the lead into Becketts. After the safety car period, Montoya retained the lead until the first round of pit stops, although Alonso remained no more than a second and a half behind as he and the Colombian traded fastest laps. Button held third, while Barrichello and Fisichella passed a slow-starting Trulli, who in turn was holding up Michael Schumacher. Räikkönen, already up four places, was thus able to close up behind Schumacher and Trulli, but was unable to overtake them until the pit stops.

Montoya made his first pit stop on lap 21, a lap earlier than planned due to traffic. Alonso followed on lap 23, rejoining the race almost side-by-side with Montoya, who again held his line. Fisichella led for the next two laps, setting the fastest lap in the process, before making his first stop. On lap 28, with every driver except Sato having pitted, Montoya led Alonso by three seconds, followed by Fisichella, Button, Barrichello, Räikkönen, Michael Schumacher and Trulli.

On lap 32 Barrichello, on a three-stop strategy, made his second stop. This enabled Räikkönen, now the fastest man on the track, to close up behind Button. Montoya responded to his team-mate's pace, and to Alonso, by setting back-to-back fastest laps on laps 40 and 41, increasing his lead over the Spaniard to over six seconds. On lap 43, Räikkönen took fourth when Button made his second stop, easily retaining this position after his own stop two laps later. Montoya pitted on lap 44, putting Alonso back in front, before Barrichello made his third stop on lap 45. On lap 46 Fisichella, on course for his first podium since winning the opening race of the season in Australia, made his second stop, but stalled as he tried to leave the pits, promoting Räikkönen to third.

Alonso led for five laps before pitting on lap 49, but lost time trying to lap Trulli. This meant that he did not have a big enough lead to make his stop and rejoin the race in front of Montoya, though he was comfortably ahead of Räikkönen. In the end, the Colombian took his first win for McLaren by 2.7 seconds. 

Räikkönen set the fastest race lap on the final lap to finish less than 12 seconds behind Alonso, while Fisichella ended up 3.5 seconds behind the Finn. Button finished a distant fifth, ahead of Michael Schumacher and Barrichello, while Ralf Schumacher edged out Toyota team-mate Trulli for the final point.

There was only one retirement in the race, Jordan's Narain Karthikeyan dropping out on lap 11 with an electrical failure.

The result allowed Alonso to increase his lead over Räikkönen in the Drivers' Championship by two points, 77 to 51. Michael Schumacher remained in third on 43 points, while Montoya moved up to sixth with 26. In the Constructors' Championship, McLaren reduced the deficit to Renault by three points, 102 to 87, Ferrari remaining in third on 74.

Classification

Qualifying

Notes
  – For the second race in a row, Kimi Räikkönen received a ten-position grid penalty for an engine change.
  – Tiago Monteiro did not complete a qualifying lap, having already received a ten-position grid penalty for an engine change.

Race

Championship standings after the race 
Bold text indicates who still has a theoretical chance of becoming World Champion.

Drivers' Championship standings

Constructors' Championship standings

Note: Only the top five positions are included for both sets of standings.

See also 
 2005 Silverstone GP2 Series round

References 

British Grand Prix
British Grand Prix
Grand Prix
British Grand Prix